The astronomical unit (symbol: au, or  or AU) is a unit of length, roughly the distance from Earth to the Sun and approximately equal to  or 8.3 light-minutes. The actual distance from Earth to the Sun varies by about 3% as Earth orbits the Sun, from a maximum (aphelion) to a minimum (perihelion) and back again once each year. The astronomical unit was originally conceived as the average of Earth's aphelion and perihelion; however, since 2012 it has been defined as exactly  (see below for several conversions).

The astronomical unit is used primarily for measuring distances within the Solar System or around other stars. It is also a fundamental component in the definition of another unit of astronomical length, the parsec.

History of symbol usage 
A variety of unit symbols and abbreviations have been in use for the astronomical unit. In a 1976 resolution, the International Astronomical Union (IAU) had used the symbol A to denote a length equal to the astronomical unit. In the astronomical literature, the symbol AU was (and remains) common. In 2006, the International Bureau of Weights and Measures (BIPM) had recommended ua as the symbol for the unit, from the French "unité astronomique". In the non-normative Annex C to ISO 80000-3:2006 (now withdrawn), the symbol of the astronomical unit was also ua.

In 2012, the IAU, noting "that various symbols are presently in use for the astronomical unit", recommended the use of the symbol "au". The scientific journals published by the American Astronomical Society and the Royal Astronomical Society subsequently adopted this symbol. In the 2014 revision and 2019 edition of the SI Brochure, the BIPM used the unit symbol "au".  ISO 80000-3:2019, which replaces ISO 80000-3:2006, does not mention the astronomical unit.

Development of unit definition 

Earth's orbit around the Sun is an ellipse. The semi-major axis of this elliptic orbit is defined to be half of the straight line segment that joins the perihelion and aphelion. The centre of the Sun lies on this straight line segment, but not at its midpoint. Because ellipses are well-understood shapes, measuring the points of its extremes defined the exact shape mathematically, and made possible calculations for the entire orbit as well as predictions based on observation. In addition, it mapped out exactly the largest straight-line distance that Earth traverses over the course of a year, defining times and places for observing the largest parallax (apparent shifts of position) in nearby stars. Knowing Earth's shift and a star's shift enabled the star's distance to be calculated. But all measurements are subject to some degree of error or uncertainty, and the uncertainties in the length of the astronomical unit only increased uncertainties in the stellar distances. Improvements in precision have always been a key to improving astronomical understanding. Throughout the twentieth century, measurements became increasingly precise and sophisticated, and ever more dependent on accurate observation of the effects described by Einstein's theory of relativity and upon the mathematical tools it used.

Improving measurements were continually checked and cross-checked by means of improved understanding of the laws of celestial mechanics, which govern the motions of objects in space. The expected positions and distances of objects at an established time are calculated (in au) from these laws, and assembled into a collection of data called an ephemeris. NASA Jet Propulsion Laboratory HORIZONS System provides one of several ephemeris computation services.

In 1976, to establish an even precise measure for the astronomical unit, the IAU formally adopted a new definition. Although directly based on the then-best available observational measurements, the definition was recast in terms of the then-best mathematical derivations from celestial mechanics and planetary ephemerides. It stated that "the astronomical unit of length is that length (A) for which the Gaussian gravitational constant (k) takes the value  when the units of measurement are the astronomical units of length, mass and time". Equivalently, by this definition, one au is "the radius of an unperturbed circular Newtonian orbit about the sun of a particle having infinitesimal mass, moving with an angular frequency of "; or alternatively that length for which the heliocentric gravitational constant (the product G) is equal to 2 au3/d2, when the length is used to describe the positions of objects in the Solar System.

Subsequent explorations of the Solar System by space probes made it possible to obtain precise measurements of the relative positions of the inner planets and other objects by means of radar and telemetry. As with all radar measurements, these rely on measuring the time taken for photons to be reflected from an object. Because all photons move at the speed of light in vacuum, a fundamental constant of the universe, the distance of an object from the probe is calculated as the product of the speed of light and the measured time. However, for precision the calculations require adjustment for things such as the motions of the probe and object while the photons are transiting. In addition, the measurement of the time itself must be translated to a standard scale that accounts for relativistic time dilation. Comparison of the ephemeris positions with time measurements expressed in Barycentric Dynamical Time (TDB) leads to a value for the speed of light in astronomical units per day (of ).

In 1983, the CIPM modified the International System of Units (SI) to make the metre defined as the distance travelled in a vacuum by light in 1 /  second. This replaced the previous definition, valid between 1960 and 1983, which was that the metre equalled a certain number of wavelengths of a certain emission line of krypton-86. (The reason for the change was an improved method of measuring the speed of light.) The speed of light could then be expressed exactly as c0 = , a standard also adopted by the IERS numerical standards. From this definition and the 2009 IAU standard, the time for light to traverse an astronomical unit is found to be τA = , which is slightly more than 8 minutes 19 seconds. By multiplication, the best IAU 2009 estimate was A = c0τA = , based on a comparison of Jet Propulsion Laboratory and IAA–RAS ephemerides.

This estimate was still derived from observation and measurements subject to error, and based on techniques that did not yet standardize all relativistic effects, and thus were not constant for all observers. In 2012, finding that the equalization of relativity alone would make the definition overly complex, the IAU simply used the 2009 estimate to redefine the astronomical unit as a conventional unit of length directly tied to the metre (exactly ). The new definition also recognizes as a consequence that the astronomical unit is now to play a role of reduced importance, limited in its use to that of a convenience in some applications.

{| style="border-spacing:0"
|-
|rowspan=7 style="vertical-align:top; padding-right:0"|1 astronomical unit 
|=  metres (by definition)
|-
|=  (exactly)
|-
|≈ 
|-
|≈  light-seconds
|-
|≈  light-minutes
|-
|≈ 
|-
|≈ 
|}

This definition makes the speed of light, defined as exactly , equal to exactly  ×  ÷  or about  au/d, some 60 parts per trillion less than the 2009 estimate.

Usage and significance 
With the definitions used before 2012, the astronomical unit was dependent on the heliocentric gravitational constant, that is the product of the gravitational constant, G, and the solar mass, . Neither G nor  can be measured to high accuracy separately, but the value of their product is known very precisely from observing the relative positions of planets (Kepler's Third Law expressed in terms of Newtonian gravitation). Only the product is required to calculate planetary positions for an ephemeris, so ephemerides are calculated in astronomical units and not in SI units.

The calculation of ephemerides also requires a consideration of the effects of general relativity. In particular, time intervals measured on Earth's surface (Terrestrial Time, TT) are not constant when compared with the motions of the planets: the terrestrial second (TT) appears to be longer near January and shorter near July when compared with the "planetary second" (conventionally measured in TDB). As the metre is defined in terms of the second and the speed of light is constant for all observers, the terrestrial metre appears to change in length compared with the "planetary metre" on a periodic basis.

The metre is defined to be a unit of proper length, but the SI definition does not specify the metric tensor to be used in determining it. Indeed, the International Committee for Weights and Measures (CIPM) notes that "its definition applies only within a spatial extent sufficiently small that the effects of the non-uniformity of the gravitational field can be ignored". As such, the metre is undefined for the purposes of measuring distances within the Solar System. The 1976 definition of the astronomical unit was incomplete because it did not specify the frame of reference in which time is to be measured, but proved practical for the calculation of ephemerides: a fuller definition that is consistent with general relativity was proposed, and "vigorous debate" ensued until August 2012 when the IAU adopted the current definition of 1 astronomical unit =  metres.

The astronomical unit is typically used for stellar system scale distances, such as the size of a protostellar disk or the heliocentric distance of an asteroid, whereas other units are used for other distances in astronomy. The astronomical unit is too small to be convenient for interstellar distances, where the parsec and light-year are widely used. The light-year is often used in popular works, but is not an approved non-SI unit and is rarely used by professional astronomers.

When simulating a numerical model of the Solar System, the astronomical unit provides an appropriate scale that minimizes (overflow, underflow and truncation) errors in floating point calculations.

History 

Hipparchus also gave an estimate of the distance of Earth from the Sun, quoted by Pappus as equal to 490 Earth radii.

A Chinese mathematical treatise, the Zhoubi Suanjing (c. 1st century BCE), shows how the distance to the Sun can be computed geometrically, using the different lengths of the noontime shadows observed at three places  li apart and the assumption that Earth is flat.

In the 2nd century CE, Ptolemy estimated the mean distance of the Sun as  times Earth's radius. To determine this value, Ptolemy started by measuring the Moon's parallax, finding what amounted to a horizontal lunar parallax of 1° 26′, which was much too large. He then derived a maximum lunar distance of  Earth radii. Because of cancelling errors in his parallax figure, his theory of the Moon's orbit, and other factors, this figure was approximately correct. He then measured the apparent sizes of the Sun and the Moon and concluded that the apparent diameter of the Sun was equal to the apparent diameter of the Moon at the Moon's greatest distance, and from records of lunar eclipses, he estimated this apparent diameter, as well as the apparent diameter of the shadow cone of Earth traversed by the Moon during a lunar eclipse. Given these data, the distance of the Sun from Earth can be trigonometrically computed to be  Earth radii. This gives a ratio of solar to lunar distance of approximately 19, matching Aristarchus's figure. Although Ptolemy's procedure is theoretically workable, it is very sensitive to small changes in the data, so much so that changing a measurement by a few per cent can make the solar distance infinite.

After Greek astronomy was transmitted to the medieval Islamic world, astronomers made some changes to Ptolemy's cosmological model, but did not greatly change his estimate of the Earth–Sun distance. For example, in his introduction to Ptolemaic astronomy, al-Farghānī gave a mean solar distance of  Earth radii, whereas in his zij, al-Battānī used a mean solar distance of  Earth radii. Subsequent astronomers, such as al-Bīrūnī, used similar values. Later in Europe, Copernicus and Tycho Brahe also used comparable figures ( and  Earth radii), and so Ptolemy's approximate Earth–Sun distance survived through the 16th century.

Johannes Kepler was the first to realize that Ptolemy's estimate must be significantly too low (according to Kepler, at least by a factor of three) in his Rudolphine Tables (1627). Kepler's laws of planetary motion allowed astronomers to calculate the relative distances of the planets from the Sun, and rekindled interest in measuring the absolute value for Earth (which could then be applied to the other planets). The invention of the telescope allowed far more accurate measurements of angles than is possible with the naked eye. Flemish astronomer Godefroy Wendelin repeated Aristarchus’ measurements in 1635, and found that Ptolemy's value was too low by a factor of at least eleven.

A somewhat more accurate estimate can be obtained by observing the transit of Venus. By measuring the transit in two different locations, one can accurately calculate the parallax of Venus and from the relative distance of Earth and Venus from the Sun, the solar parallax  (which cannot be measured directly due to the brightness of the Sun). The solar parallax is related to the Earth–Sun distance as measured in Earth radii by

Although Huygens' estimate is remarkably close to modern values, it is often discounted by historians of astronomy because of the many unproven (and incorrect) assumptions he had to make for his method to work; the accuracy of his value seems to be based more on luck than good measurement, with his various errors cancelling each other out.

Jean Richer and Giovanni Domenico Cassini measured the parallax of Mars between Paris and Cayenne in French Guiana when Mars was at its closest to Earth in 1672. They were also the first astronomers to have access to an accurate and reliable value for the radius of Earth, which had been measured by their colleague Jean Picard in 1669 as  toises. This same year saw another estimate for the astronomical unit by John Flamsteed, which accomplished it alone by measuring the martian diurnal parallax. Another colleague, Ole Rømer, discovered the finite speed of light in 1676: the speed was so great that it was usually quoted as the time required for light to travel from the Sun to the Earth, or "light time per unit distance", a convention that is still followed by astronomers today.

A better method for observing Venus transits was devised by James Gregory and published in his Optica Promata (1663). It was strongly advocated by Edmond Halley and was applied to the transits of Venus observed in 1761 and 1769, and then again in 1874 and 1882. Transits of Venus occur in pairs, but less than one pair every century, and observing the transits in 1761 and 1769 was an unprecedented international scientific operation including observations by James Cook and Charles Green from Tahiti. Despite the Seven Years' War, dozens of astronomers were dispatched to observing points around the world at great expense and personal danger: several of them died in the endeavour.

Another method involved determining the constant of aberration. Newcomb also collaborated with A. A. Michelson to measure the speed of light with Earth-based equipment; combined with the constant of aberration (which is related to the light time per unit distance), this gave the first direct measurement of the Earth–Sun distance in kilometres. Newcomb's value for the solar parallax (and for the constant of aberration and the Gaussian gravitational constant) were incorporated into the first international system of astronomical constants in 1896, which remained in place for the calculation of ephemerides until 1964. The name "astronomical unit" appears first to have been used in 1903.

The discovery of the near-Earth asteroid 433 Eros and its passage near Earth in 1900–1901 allowed a considerable improvement in parallax measurement. Another international project to measure the parallax of 433 Eros was undertaken in 1930–1931.

Direct radar measurements of the distances to Venus and Mars became available in the early 1960s. Along with improved measurements of the speed of light, these showed that Newcomb's values for the solar parallax and the constant of aberration were inconsistent with one another.

Developments 

The unit distance  (the value of the astronomical unit in metres) can be expressed in terms of other astronomical constants:

The Sun is constantly losing mass by radiating away energy, so the orbits of the planets are steadily expanding outward from the Sun. This has led to calls to abandon the astronomical unit as a unit of measurement.

As the speed of light has an exact defined value in SI units and the Gaussian gravitational constant  is fixed in the astronomical system of units, measuring the light time per unit distance is exactly equivalent to measuring the product × in SI units. Hence, it is possible to construct ephemerides entirely in SI units, which is increasingly becoming the norm.

A 2004 analysis of radiometric measurements in the inner Solar System suggested that the secular increase in the unit distance was much larger than can be accounted for by solar radiation, + metres per century.

The measurements of the secular variations of the astronomical unit are not confirmed by other authors and are quite controversial.
Furthermore, since 2010, the astronomical unit has not been estimated by the planetary ephemerides.

Examples 
The following table contains some distances given in astronomical units. It includes some examples with distances that are normally not given in astronomical units, because they are either too short or far too long. Distances normally change over time. Examples are listed by increasing distance.

See also 
 Orders of magnitude (length)

References

Further reading

External links 
 The IAU and astronomical units
 Recommendations concerning Units (HTML version of the IAU Style Manual)
 Chasing Venus, Observing the Transits of Venus
 Transit of Venus

Celestial mechanics
Unit
Units of length